The China Computer Federation (CCF) is a professional body and learned society in the field of computer science in China. It was created under the name "Computer Professional Committee of China Electronics Society" in June 1962. As of 2019, it has 36 specialized committees, 12 working committees and 32 local member activity centers.

History
The China Computer Federation was established in 1962 in China for the purpose of providing services for the academic and professional development of professionals in the field of computer science, promoting the application of academic progress and technological achievements, conducting academic evaluation and leading the academic direction, promoting the exchange and interaction of technology and industrial applications, and recognizing and commending individuals, enterprises and units with outstanding achievements in academic and technological fields. It was forced to close between 1966 and 1979 during the ten-year Cultural Revolution. In January 1979 it was renamed "Computer Society of Chinese Society of Electronics". In March 1985 its name was changed to "China Computer Federation".

Scientific publishing
 Communication of China Computer Society

References

External links
 
 

Computer science institutes in China
Scientific organizations established in 1962
Organizations based in Beijing
1962 establishments in China